William Westwood may refer to:

William Westwood (bushranger) (1821–1846), British-born Australian convict and bushranger (alias Jackey Jackey)
William Westwood, 1st Baron Westwood (1880–1953), British trade unionist and Labour politician
William James Westwood (1887–1954), Canadian politician
William Westwood, 2nd Baron Westwood (1907–1991), British peer and former chairman of Newcastle United, son of the 1st Baron
William John Westwood (1925–1999), British bishop